Simnia is a genus of sea snails, marine gastropod mollusks in the family Ovulidae.

Taxonomy
Dolin & Ledon (2002) considered that the lectotype of Simnia nicaeensis Risso, 1826, type species of Simnia, is a juvenile specimen of Simnia spelta (Linnaeus, 1758) type species of Neosimnia Fischer, 1884. This makes Simnia an objective synonym of Neosimnia. Accordingly, all the species treated in Lorenz & Fehse (2009) under Neosimnia should thereby be accepted under Simnia. Likewise, all the species treated by Lorenz & Fehse (2009) under Simnia should thereby be accepted under Xandarovula Cate, 1973.
The assumptions of Dolin (Dolin & Ledon, 2002) are based on interpretations but not on the examination of the type material. Fehse (2016) has confirmed the vaility of the genus Neosimnia because the lectotype of Simnia nicaeensis Risso, 1826, type species of Simnia, is never a juvenile specimen of Simnia spelta (Linnaeus, 1758) type species of Neosimnia Fischer, 1884.

Species
The valid assignment of the taxa are found in Lorenz & Fehse, 2009.
The assumption of Dolin prepared the following chaos:
Species within the genus Simnia include:
Simnia aequalis (Sowerby, 1832)
Simnia aperta (Sowerby, 1849)
Simnia arcuata (Reeve, 1865)
Simnia avena (G.B. Sowerby I, 1832)
Simnia barbarensis Dall, 1892
Simnia bartschi (Cate, 1973)
Simnia bijuri (Cate, 1976)
 Simnia brevirostris (Schumacher, 1817)
 † Simnia fusulina Dolin & Lozouet, 2004 
Simnia hammesi (Bertsch & Bibbey, 1982)
 † Simnia helenae Dolin & Lozouet, 2004 
Simnia hiscocki Lorenz & Melaun, 2011 
Simnia hyalina Lorenz & Fehse, 2009
Simnia illyrica (Schilder, 1925)
Simnia jacintoi Fehse & Trigo, 2015 
 † Simnia lhommei (Cossmann, 1907) 
 † Simnia limondinae Dolin & Lozouet, 2004 
Simnia loebbeckeana (Weinkauff, 1881)
Simnia macleani (Cate, 1976)
Simnia patula (Pennant, 1777)
  † Simnia rostralina (Deshayes, 1865)
Simnia sculptura (Cate, 1973)
Simnia senegalensis (Schilder, 1931)
Simnia spelta (Linnaeus, 1758)
 † Simnia vibrayana (de Raincourt, 1870) 
Simnia vidleri (Sowerby, 1881)
Species brought into synonymy
Simnia acicularis (Lamarck, 1811): synonym of Cymbovula acicularis (Lamarck, 1811)
 Simnia aequalis (G. B. Sowerby I, 1832): synonym of Neosimnia avena (G. B. Sowerby I, 1833) synonym of Simnia avena (G. B. Sowerby I, 1833)
Simnia aureocincta Dall, 1899: synonym of Cyphoma aureocinctum (Dall, 1889)
Simnia inflexa Schilder, 1941: synonym of Simnialena rufa (Sowerby, 1832)
Simnia inflexa (Sowerby, 1832): synonym of Simnialena rufa (Sowerby, 1832)
Simnia nicaeensis Risso, 1826: synonym of Simnia spelta (Linnaeus, 1758)
Simnia nicaoensis Risso, 1826: synonym of Simnia nicaeensis Risso, 1826
Simnia piragua Dall, 1889: synonym of Calcarovula piragua (Dall, 1889)
Simnia rufa (Sowerby, 1832): synonym of Simnialena rufa (Sowerby, 1832)
Simnia sowerbyana Paetel, 1887: synonym of Phenacovolva brevirostris (Schumacher, 1817)
Simnia uniplicata (Sowerby, 1849): synonym of Simnialena uniplicata (Sowerby, 1849)
Simnia xanthochila Kuroda, 1928: synonym of Contrasimnia xanthochila (Kuroda, 1928)

References

 Dall W.H. 1889. Reports on the results of dredging, under the supervision of Alexander Agassiz, in the Gulf of Mexico (1877-78) and in the Caribbean Sea (1879-80), by the U.S. Coast Survey Steamer "Blake", Lieut.-Commander C.D. Sigsbee, U.S.N., and Commander J.R. Bartlett, U.S.N., commanding. XXIX. Report on the Mollusca. Part 2, Gastropoda and Scaphopoda. Bulletin of the Museum of Comparative Zoölogy at Harvard College, 18: 1-492, pls. 10-40
 Cate C.N. (1973). A Systematic Revision of the Recent Cypraeid Family Ovulidae. The Veliger, Vol 15, Supplement.
 Gofas, S.; Le Renard, J.; Bouchet, P. (2001). Mollusca, in: Costello, M.J. et al. (Ed.) (2001). European register of marine species: a check-list of the marine species in Europe and a bibliography of guides to their identification. Collection Patrimoines Naturels, 50: pp. 180–213
  Dolin L. & Ledon D., 2002. Nouveaux taxons et discussion de la systématique des genres correspondants d'Ovulidae (Mollusca, Caenogastropoda) de l'Éocène inférieur de Gan (France). Geodiversitas 24(2): 329-347
 Fehse, D. (2016): Superfamilia Cypraeoidea J.E. Gray, 1824 - In: Stein, G. Moths, H. Albrecht, F. Havekost, U. & Fehse, D. (eds.): Revision der miozänen Molluskenfauna (Hemmoorium) von Werder bei Achim (Nordwest-Niedersachsen): 33-41, pls. 16-19, text figs. 8-13. – Palaeofocus, 5: 1-289, pls. 1-76, text figs. 1-93, tabs. 1-5.

External links

Ovulidae